"Don't Believe My Heart Can't Stand Another You" is a song written Billy Ray Reynolds, and recorded by American country music artist Tanya Tucker.  It was released in November 1975 as the first single from her album Lovin' and Learnin'.  The song peaked at number 4 on the Billboard Hot Country Singles chart. It also reached number 1 on the RPM Country Tracks chart in Canada.

Chart performance

References

1975 singles
1975 songs
Tanya Tucker songs
MCA Records singles
Song recordings produced by Jerry Crutchfield